Pelochelys is a genus of very large softshell turtles in the family Trionychidae. They are found from peninsular India northeast to southern China, and south to Southeast Asia and New Guinea.

The species in this genus, while still being freshwater turtles as with all Trionychidae, are unique for having significant salt tolerance and regularly entering near-coastal marine habitats.

Species
These three species are recognized as being valid:
Pelochelys bibroni (Owen, 1853) – southern New Guinea giant softshell turtle
Pelochelys cantorii Gray, 1864 – Cantor's giant softshell turtle
Pelochelys signifera Webb, 2002 – northern New Guinea giant softshell turtle

Nota bene: In the above list, a binomial authority in parentheses indicates that the species was originally described in a genus other than Pelochelys.

References

Works cited

Further reading
Boulenger GA. 1889. Catalogue of the Chelonians, Rhynchocephalians, and Crocodiles in the British Museum (Natural History). New Edition. London: Trustees of the British Museum (Natural History). (Taylor and Francis, printers). x + 311 pp. + Plates I-VI. (Genus Pelochelys, p. 262, figure 69).
Gray JE. 1864. Revision of the Species of Trionychidæ found in Asia and Africa, with Descriptions of some New Species. Proc. Zool. Soc. London 1864: 76–98. (Pelochelys, new genus, p. 89).

 
Turtle genera
Taxa named by John Edward Gray